A resultant is a mathematical tool allowing testing whether two polynomials have a common root.

As an adjective, resultant may refer to:
 resultant force, a physics concept
 resultant tone, a musical phenomenon
 resultant vector, the result of adding two or more vectors